Dixon Township may refer to the following townships in the United States:

 Dixon Township, Lee County, Illinois
 Dixon Township, Logan County, North Dakota
 Dixon Township, Preble County, Ohio

See also 
 South Dixon Township, Lee County, Illinois